The Ambassador of Ireland to Great Britain is Ireland's foremost diplomatic representative in the United Kingdom and is in charge of Ireland's diplomatic mission in the UK.

History

The High Commission of the Irish Free State was established shortly after Irish secession from the United Kingdom. The first High Commissioner of the Irish Free State to the United Kingdom was James McNeill, who later became the second Governor-General of the state in 1928. From 1936, the Irish government regarded the state as being no longer a member of the British Commonwealth, but rather a state associated with it. Nonetheless, the office holder retained his title. In 1937, the Irish Free State was renamed Ireland so the High Commissioner’s title was changed to High Commissioner of Ireland to the United Kingdom. The officeholder retained that title until Ireland’s last links with the Commonwealth were terminated in 1949. The High Commissioner at the time then became the Ambassador of Ireland to the United Kingdom. The Irish Foreign Ministry name their Embassy in London as the Embassy to Great Britain due to nationalist sensitivities concerning the full name "United Kingdom of Great Britain and Northern Ireland".

Heads of mission

High Commissioners 

 James McNeill 1923–1928
 Prof. T. A. Smiddy 1929–1930
 John Whelan Dulanty 1930–1949

Ambassadors 
 John Whelan Dulanty 1949–1950
 Frederick Henry Boland 1950–1956
 Con Cremin 1956–1958
 Hugh McCann 1958–1963
 Con Cremin 1963–1964
 Donal O'Sullivan 1970–1977
 Paul Keating 1977–1978
 Edward Kennedy 1978–1983
 Noel Dorr 1983–1987
 Andrew O'Rourke 1987–1991
 Joseph Small 1991–1995
 Edward J. Barrington 1995–2001
 Dáithí O'Ceallaigh 2001–2007
 David J. Cooney 2007–2009
 Bobby McDonagh 2009–2013
 Daniel Mulhall 2013–2017
 Adrian O'Neill 2017–2022
 Martin Fraser 2022–present

External links
Embassy of Ireland to Great Britain: The Embassy’s History

Notes

United Kingdom

Ireland
Ireland and the Commonwealth of Nations